Tracy Byrd is a male country music singer.

Tracy Byrd may also refer to:

Tracy Byrd (boxer), female boxer
Tracy Byrd (album), an album by the singer